Oakland is a village in Burrillville, Providence County, Rhode Island, United States.  It was developed in the 19th century at the site of a stone mill (now surviving only in fragmentary ruins) near the confluence of the Chepachet and Clear Rivers. It is one of the few remaining stone mills in this state.   Most of the village is included in the Oakland Historic District, a historic district listed on the National Register of Historic Places.  Most of the housing in the village was originally built to house mill workers, although there are several more elaborate houses built for mill executives.

Students living in Oakland attend Burrillville Middle and High School. Oakland is a small, yet beautiful community hidden in the top left corner of Rhode Island. Oakland offers many woodland areas and rivers. The small town relies on volunteer firefighters. Each day a town whistle sounds from the Oakland-Mapleville Fire Department at five-o'clock pm, as well as each time fire personnel is in need. Many historic mills are scattered throughout the town, as well as mill-style neighborhoods.

See also
National Register of Historic Places listings in Providence County, Rhode Island

References

External links

Preserve America

Historic districts in Providence County, Rhode Island
Villages in Providence County, Rhode Island
Burrillville, Rhode Island
Shingle Style architecture in Rhode Island
Providence metropolitan area
Villages in Rhode Island
Historic districts on the National Register of Historic Places in Rhode Island
National Register of Historic Places in Providence County, Rhode Island